Sierra Mist was a lemon-lime flavored soft drink line. Originally introduced by PepsiCo in 1999, it was eventually made available in all United States markets by 2003. The drink was rebranded as "Mist Twst" in 2016, but reverted to Sierra Mist in 2018. The brand was aimed at competing with The Coca-Cola Company's Sprite brand and Keurig Dr Pepper's 7 Up.

Composition

Original formula 
From 2000 until 2006 Sierra Mist was sweetened with high-fructose corn syrup and/or sugar. From 2006 until 2010, it was sweetened with just high-fructose corn syrup. Its other ingredients were listed as carbonated water, citric acid, natural flavors, potassium benzoate, potassium citrate, ascorbic acid and calcium disodium EDTA. Diet Sierra Mist is sweetened with aspartame and acesulfame potassium.

Sierra Mist Natural 
In August 2010 PepsiCo replaced the original Sierra Mist formula with Sierra Mist Natural, which is sweetened with sucrose (table sugar) instead of high fructose corn syrup. The new formulation contains four other ingredients: carbonated water, citric acid, natural flavor, potassium citrate, and ethylenediaminetetraacetic acid.

Addition of stevia
By 2013, Sierra Mist Natural reverted its name to simply Sierra Mist, and in 2014 the formulation was changed to use a combination of sucrose and stevia as sweeteners, in an effort to cut calories in drinks. The change proved unpopular, with complaints of the stevia introducing an unpleasant aftertaste.

Mist Twst 
In December 2015, PepsiCo announced that they were changing the name of Sierra Mist to "Mist Twst" in spring 2016. The change occurred in some areas in March 2016. The new Mist Twst has added high-fructose corn syrup back to the formula.

Re-rebranding of Sierra Mist and discontinuation
In July 2018, Mist Twst's name reverted to Sierra Mist. In January 2023, Pepsi announced the discontinuation of the brand; Sierra Mist has been replaced with Starry.

Promotion and sponsorship 
In 2005, a series of improv-based Sierra Mist commercials titled "Mist Takes" began airing. The commercials featured comedians Nicole Sullivan, Debra Wilson, Aries Spears, Jim Gaffigan and Michael Ian Black. In 2006, Kathy Griffin, Tracy Morgan and Guillermo Diaz joined the cast. Diaz and other members of the cast of Otro Rollo starred in the Spanish-language versions of the commercials. In 2007, Nicole Randall Johnson and Eliza Coupe joined the cast, replacing Debra Wilson and Kathy Griffin.

In December 2007, PepsiCo trademarked the names "Sierra Mist: Undercover Orange" and "Sierra Mist Free: Undercover Orange". The two sodas launched under a limited-time release in the summer of 2008 (with the faces of Steve Carell and Anne Hathaway on their labels), serving as a marketing tie-in with the release of the Warner Bros. film Get Smart on June 20, 2008. Sierra Mist: Undercover Orange and Sierra Mist Free: Undercover Orange were both clear sodas, like regular and Diet Sierra Mist, but had a mandarin orange flavor.

Sierra Mist was an official partner and sponsor of Major League Soccer and two franchises within the league, the New England Revolution and D.C. United. The league deal ended in 2015 when Coca-Cola announced a partnership with MLS and the US Soccer Federation.

Product variants

References

External links 
 
 'Pepsi release Sierra Mist and Mountain Dew in the UK as part of a 70 m makeover'

Lemon-lime sodas
PepsiCo brands
PepsiCo soft drinks
Discontinued soft drinks
Products introduced in 1999
Products and services discontinued in 2023